Lower Goose Creek Reservoir is a lake located  above sea level, south of the town of Oakley in Cassia County, Idaho, United States. Oakley Dam impounds the reservoir's primary inflow, Goose Creek. All of the creek's water is stored in the reservoir for irrigation.

References

Reservoirs in Idaho
Rivers of Cassia County, Idaho